"That's the Beat of a Heart" is a song written by Tena Clark and Tim Heintz and recorded by American country music duo The Warren Brothers featuring Sara Evans. It was released in March 2000 as the first single from their album King of Nothing. It was also included on the soundtrack to the 2000 film Where the Heart Is. 

The song peaked at number 22 on the US Billboard Hot Country Singles & Tracks chart and reached number 38 on the RPM Country Tracks chart in Canada. It was nominated for Vocal Event of the Year at the 2001 Academy of Country Music Awards.

Music video
The music video was directed by Shaun Silva and filmed in Franklin, Tennessee.

Chart performance

Year-end charts

References

2000 singles
The Warren Brothers songs
Sara Evans songs
BNA Records singles
Music videos directed by Shaun Silva
Vocal collaborations
Song recordings produced by Chris Farren (country musician)
2000 songs